Your Face is a 2015 EP by Venetian Snares releases under Planet Mu Records. Your Face was announced on July 8, 2015 and released on July 24. It followed My Love Is a Bulldozer which was Venetian Snares' first album after a two year hiatus.

Track listing

Side A
 "Your Face When I Finally" (6:32)
 "Former Eagle" (2:34)
 "Red Orange 2" (3:45)

Side B
 "Become Magic Dolphins" (5:20)
 "Stockpiles of Sentiment" (4:54)
 "Misericordial" (4:27)
 "Your Face When I Finally (glass version)" (3:12)

References

External links
 DISCOGS page

2015 EPs
Venetian Snares albums
Planet Mu albums